Hubert Matynia (born 4 November 1995) is a Polish professional footballer who plays as a left-back for Ekstraklasa side Miedź Legnica.

International career
Matynia played for Poland U20.

On 5 November 2018 Matynia was called up for Poland by Jerzy Brzęczek for a friendly match against Czech Republic and for the 2018-19 UEFA Nations League campaign against Portugal.

References

External links
 
 

Living people
1995 births
Association football defenders
Polish footballers
Poland youth international footballers
Pogoń Szczecin players
Miedź Legnica players
Ekstraklasa players
III liga players
People from Września
Sportspeople from Greater Poland Voivodeship